Leonardo Ghiraldini (born 26 December 1984) is a retired Italian international rugby union player. Ghiraldini's playing position is hooker.

Club career
Ghiraldini began his career with Petrarca Rugby in his home town of Padua before moving to Rugby Calvisano in 2005 where, as captain, he won the Super 10 (now Top12) in 2008 and was a runner-up with them in 2006. In 2009, Ghiraldini moved to Benetton Treviso, which joined the Celtic League in 2010.

On 21 May 2014, Ghiraldini moved to England to join Leicester Tigers in the Aviva Premiership from the 2014-15 season. In December 2015, Ghiraldini joined top French club Toulouse in the Top 14 on a three-year deal.

International career
Ghiraldini played for the Italian U-18, U-19 and U-21 teams before playing for the Italy A Team. He was regarded as one of Italian rugby's stars of the future.

Ghiraldini played his first international game against Japan during Italy's 2006 summer tour. Ghiraldini was in the Italian squad for the 2007 Six Nations Championship and the 2007 Rugby World Cup, he made his World Cup debut against Portugal. He was in the Italy squad for the 2008 Six Nations Championship, playing as starting hooker in all five games of the tournament.

For the 2010 Six Nations Championship, Ghiraldini was named Italian captain after Sergio Parisse was ruled out of the tournament with an injury.

On 18 August 2019, he was named in the final 31-man squad for the 2019 Rugby World Cup and he represented Italy on 107 occasions, from 2006 to 2020.

Honours

Calvisano
Super 10 winner (1): 2008. runner-up (1): 2006

References

External links
RBS 6 Nations profile

1984 births
Living people
Sportspeople from Padua
Italian rugby union players
Benetton Rugby players
Rugby Calvisano players
Leicester Tigers players
Rugby union hookers
Italy international rugby union players
Italian expatriate rugby union players
Italian expatriate sportspeople in England
Expatriate rugby union players in England